Ben Dorcy  (May 19, 1925 – September 16, 2017) was the first person to be inducted into the Roadies Hall of Fame in Nashville in 2009. From 1960 until 1963 he was a delivery driver for Nudie Cohn. He was a roadie for Hank Thompson, Elvis Presley, Johnny Cash and Willie Nelson. His work with Nelson was highlighted in the documentary King of the Roadies.

Ben Dorcy Day is celebrated on February 22, the day Ben met Willie Nelson.

References

1925 births
2017 deaths
American music people
Road crew